Emile Samyn (born 28 April 1997) is a Belgian footballer who plays for Knokke as a right winger.

Career
Samyn is a product of Roeselare. On 2 September 2019 it was confirmed, that Samyn had been loaned out to Belgian First Amateur Division club Lierse Kempenzonen for the rest of the season.

On 14 April 2021, he agreed to join Knokke.

References

External links

1997 births
Living people
Belgian footballers
Association football wingers
K.S.V. Roeselare players
Lierse Kempenzonen players
Challenger Pro League players
Belgian Third Division players